This page details awards won by the Kansas City Chiefs, a professional American football team from the National Football League. The Chiefs have never had a winner of the Coach of the Year award, Offensive Rookie of the Year, or Defensive Player of the Year. The Chiefs are tied with the Chicago Bears for the most winners of the Walter Payton Man of the Year award with 5.

The most recent winner of a major NFL award is Patrick Mahomes who won league MVP for the 2022 season, his second time winning the award.

The Chiefs have two awards that are awarded by the team which are voted on by the players and coaches. The Derrick Thomas award is awarded to the team MVP and the Mack Lee Hill award is awarded to the Rookie of the Year.

Individual league awards

National Football League Most Valuable Player: (2)
2018: Patrick Mahomes, QB
2022: Patrick Mahomes, QB

Defensive Rookie of the Year: (4)

1984: Bill Maas, DT
1989: Derrick Thomas, LB
1992: Dale Carter, CB
2015: Marcus Peters, CB

Offensive Player of the Year: (2)

2002: Priest Holmes, RB
2018: Patrick Mahomes, QB

Super Bowl MVP: (3)

1969: Len Dawson, QB (IV)
2019: Patrick Mahomes, QB (LIV)
2022: Patrick Mahomes, QB (LVII)

Walter Payton Man of the Year Award: (5)

1972: Willie Lanier, LB
1973: Len Dawson, QB
1993: Derrick Thomas, LB
2003: Will Shields, G
2009: Brian Waters, G

Comeback Player of the Year: (1)
2015: Eric Berry, S

Non-league awards
Awards listed below are awards provided outside of the NFL.

ESPY Award
2016: Eric Berry, S, Best Comeback Athlete ESPY Award
2019: 2018 Team, Best Game ESPY Award, 2018 Regular Season game vs Los Angeles Rams
2019: Patrick Mahomes, QB, Best NFL Player ESPY Award
2021: Laurent Duvernay-Tardif, T, Muhammad Ali Sports Humanitarian Award
2022: 2021 team, Best Game ESPY Award, 2021-22 NFL Playoffs Divisional game vs Buffalo Bills

Sports Illustrated Sportsperson of the Year
2020: Patrick Mahomes, QB
2020: Laurent Duvernay-Tardif, T

Time Magazine 100 Most Influential People
2020: Patrick Mahomes, QB

Individual team awards

Ed Block Courage Award  
The Ed Block Courage Award has annually honored one player from every NFL team who exemplifies commitment to the principles of sportsmanship and courage. The award is selected by a vote of their teammates.

 1983 Dave Lutz
 1984 Kevin Ross
 1985 Mark Robinson
 1986 Dino Hackett
 1987 Lloyd Burruss
 1988 Christian Okoye
 1989 Deron Cherry
 1990 Jayice Pearson
 1991 Rich Baldinger
 1992 Albert Lewis
 1993 Neil Smith
 1994 John Alt
 1995 Dave Szott
 1996 Lake Dawson
 1997 Glenn Parker
 1998 Tim Grunhard
 1999 Eric Hicks
 2000 Tony Richardson
 2001 Tony Richardson
 2002 John Browning
 2003 Jerome Woods
 2004 Priest Holmes
 2005 Will Shields
 2006 Benny Sapp
 2007 Eddie Kennison
 2008 Damon Huard
 2009 Brodie Croyle
 2010 Dustin Colquitt
 2011 Jon McGraw
 2012 Jamaal Charles
 2013 Rodney Hudson
 2014 Travis Kelce
 2015 Eric Berry
 2016 Justin Houston
 2017 Derrick Johnson
 2018 Dee Ford
 2019 Eric Fisher
 2020 Austin Reiter
 2021 Joe Thuney

Derrick Thomas Award 
The Derrick Thomas Award is given to the Chiefs MVP as determined by the players and coaches. The award was named after the former Chiefs linebacker beginning with the 2001 award. Running back Jamaal Charles has won the award more times than any other player. Charles won the award 4 times.

 1979 Gary Barbaro
 1980 Art Still
 1981 Joe Delaney
 1982 Gary Green
 1983 Bill Kenney
 1984 Art Still
 1985 Lloyd Burruss
 1986 Albert Lewis
 1987 Carlos Carson
 1988 Deron Cherry
 1989 Christian Okoye
 1990 Steve DeBerg
 1991 Derrick Thomas
 1992 Neil Smith
 1993 Marcus Allen
 1994 Derrick Thomas
 1995 Marcus Allen
 1996 Mark Collins
 1997 Andre Rison
 1998 Glenn Parker
 1999 Marvcus Patton
 2000 Derrick Alexander
 2001 Priest Holmes
 2002 Priest Holmes
 2003 Trent Green
 2004 Trent Green
 2005 Larry Johnson
 2006 Larry Johnson
 2007 Jared Allen
 2008 Tony Gonzalez
 2009 Jamaal Charles
 2010 Jamaal Charles
 2011 Derrick Johnson
 2012 Jamaal Charles
 2013 Jamaal Charles
 2014 Justin Houston
 2015 Alex Smith & Eric Berry
 2016 Eric Berry
 2017 Alex Smith
 2018 Patrick Mahomes
 2019 Tyrann Mathieu
 2020 Travis Kelce
 2021 Tyrann Mathieu
 2022 Patrick Mahomes

Mack Lee Hill Award 
The Mack Lee Hill Award is given to the Chiefs rookie of the year as determined by the players and coaches. It has been awarded since 1966. The award was named after former Chiefs running back Mack Lee Hill beginning in 2001.

 1966 Mike Garrett
 1967 Jan Stenerud
 1968 Robert Holmes
 1969 Jim Marsalis
 1970 Jack Rudnay
 1971 Elmo Wright
 1972 Larry Marshall
 1973 Gary Butler
 1974 Woody Green
 1975 Walter White
 1976 Gary Barbaro
 1977 Gary Green
 1978 Don Parrish
 1979 Bob Grupp
 1980 Eric Harris
 1981 Lloyd Burruss
 1982 Les Studdard
 1983 David Lutz
 1984 Kevin Ross
 1985 Jeff Smith
 1986 Dino Hackett
 1987 Christian Okoye
 1988 James Saxon
 1989 Derrick Thomas
 1990 Percy Snow
 1991 Tracy Simien
 1992 Willie Davis
 1993 Will Shields
 1994 Lake Dawson
 1995 Tamarick Vanover
 1996 Reggie Tongue
 1997 Tony Gonzalez
 1998 Victor Riley
 1999 Mike Maslowski
 2000 Greg Wesley
 2001 Eric Downing
 2002 Scott Fujita
 2003 Jimmy Wilkerson & Kawika Mitchell
 2004 Jared Allen
 2005 Derrick Johnson
 2006 Tamba Hali
 2007 Dwayne Bowe
 2008 Maurice Leggett
 2009 Ryan Succop
 2010 Eric Berry
 2011 Justin Houston
 2012 Dontari Poe
 2013 Marcus Cooper
 2014 De'Anthony Thomas
 2015 Marcus Peters
 2016 Tyreek Hill
 2017 Kareem Hunt
 2018 Andrew Wylie
 2019 Mecole Hardman
 2020 Clyde Edwards-Helaire
 2021 Nick Bolton
 2022 Isiah Pacheco

Awards
American football team records and statistics